Pericoma is a genus of moth flies in the family Psychodidae. There are at least 190 described species in Pericoma.

See also
 List of Pericoma species

References

Further reading

 

Psychodidae
Articles created by Qbugbot
Psychodomorpha genera
Taxa named by Alexander Henry Haliday